Vice-Admiral Richard Charles Thompson,  (born 12 February 1966) is a senior Royal Navy officer.

Early life and education
Thompson was born on 12 February 1966 in Reading, Berkshire, England. He was educated at Meadway School, a state school in Reading. He studied engineering at the Royal Naval Engineering College and King's College London.

Naval career
Thompson joined the Royal Navy in 1985. He served with 845 Naval Air Squadron from 1989 to 1991, and with 845 Naval Air Squadron from 1991 to 1993. He served as Senior Air Engineer on the aircraft carrier HMS Ark Royal and went on to be team leader responsible for the procurement and integration of the Lightning II multirole combat aircraft.

Thompson became Director (Technical) at the Military Aviation Authority in October 2016. He was appointed Director General Air at Defence Equipment and Support and Air Member for Materiel on the Air Force Board in September 2020.

He was appointed an Officer of the Order of the British Empire (OBE) in the 2007 Birthday Honours, and promoted to Commander of the Order of the British Empire (CBE) in the 2014 New Year Honours.

References

                                                                                                                                                                                                         

1966 births
Royal Navy admirals
Commanders of the Order of the British Empire
Living people
People from Reading, Berkshire
Alumni of King's College London
Military personnel from Reading, Berkshire